Healy Lake (Mendees Cheeg in the Healy Lake-Joseph Village dialect of Tanacross Athabascan, meaning "body of water, with an outlet") is a census-designated place (CDP) in Southeast Fairbanks Census Area, Alaska, United States. The population was 13 at the 2010 census, down from 37 in 2000.

Geography
Healy Lake is located at  (63.988835, -144.708173). The Healy Lake Village is located roughly 29 miles east of Delta Junction, Alaska.

The lake is about 5 miles long.

Demographics

Healy Lake first appeared on the 1980 U.S. Census as a census-designated place (CDP).

As of the census of 2000, there were 37 people, 13 households, and 9 families residing in the CDP. The population density was 0.6 people per square mile (0.2/km2). There were 21 housing units at an average density of 0.3/sq mi (0.1/km2). The racial makeup of the CDP was 27.03% White and 72.97% Native American.

Of the 13 households, 53.8% had children under the age of 18 living with them, 38.5% were married couples living together, 7.7% had a female householder with no husband present, and 23.1% were non-families. 15.4% of all households were made up of individuals, and none had someone living alone who was 65 years of age or older. The average household size was 2.85 and the average family size was 3.10.

In the CDP, the population was spread out, with 35.1% under the age of 18, 10.8% from 18 to 24, 40.5% from 25 to 44, 13.5% from 45 to 64, . The median age was 26 years. For every 100 females, there were 164.3 males. For every 100 females age 18 and over, there were 200.0 males.

The median income for a household in the CDP was $51,250, and the median income for a family was $53,750. Males had a median income of $25,417 versus $38,750 for females. The per capita income for the CDP was $18,127. There were 12.5% of families and 9.1% of the population living below the poverty line, including 5.3% of under eighteens and none of those over 64.

Archaeology
Coordinates: 64°N, 144°45'W

Healy Lake Village is a large historic and prehistoric site located on the NE shore of Healy Lake, ca 200 km SE of Fairbanks and 50 km E of Delta Junction, Alaska. It is located near Tanana River, and the Healy River. Ancient artifacts recovered in the area demonstrate human occupation spanning as much as 11,000 years.

Transportation
Healy Lake is not on the road system. The main way in or out is by air. 

Healy Lake Airport  is an airport serving Healy Lake. Scheduled airline passenger service at this airport is subsidized by the United States Department of Transportation via the Essential Air Service program.

Airline and destinations 

The following airline offers scheduled passenger service at this airport:

Statistics

See also 
 Healy River Airport in Healy, Alaska (Denali Borough) at coordinates

References

Other sources for airport

 Essential Air Service documents (Docket DOT-OST-1998-3546) from the U.S. Department of Transportation:
 Order 2004-5-13 (May 14, 2004): tentatively re-selects 40-Mile Air, Ltd., to provide essential air service at Healy Lake, Alaska, for a two-year period from June 1, 2004, through May 31, 2006, at an annual subsidy of $51,781.
 Order 2006-4-11 (April 7, 2006): re-selecting 40-Mile Air, Ltd., to provide subsidized essential air service at Healy Lake, Alaska, at an annual subsidy rate of $71,105 for the period of June 1, 2006, through May 31, 2008.
 Order 2008-4-41 (April 29, 2008): selected 40-Mile Air, Inc., to continue providing subsidized EAS at Chisana and Healy Lake for the two-year period through May 31, 2010, and established an annual subsidy rate of $77,683 for two nonstop round trips per week between Healy Lake and Fairbanks with 5-seat Cessna 206 or 207 aircraft.
 Order 2010-4-15 (April 23, 2010): selected 40-Mile Air, Inc., to continue providing EAS at Chisana and Healy Lake for the two-year period through May 31, 2012, and established an annual subsidy rate of $98,915 for two nonstop round trips per week between Healy Lake and Fairbanks with 5-seat Cessna 206 or 207 aircraft.
 Order 2012-6-18 (June 22, 2012): re-selecting 40-Mile Air, Inc., to continue providing Essential Air Service (EAS) at Chisana and Healy Lake, Alaska, and establishing annual subsidy rates of $81,040 and $104,703, respectively, for a new two-year period, through May 31, 2014. Two nonstop round trips between Healy Lake and Fairbanks with 5-seat Cessna 206 or 207 aircraft. Route FAI-HKB-FAI.

External links 

 40-Mile Air
 Aerial photo as of August 1996 from USGS The National Map

Tanana Athabaskans
Census-designated places in Alaska
Census-designated places in Southeast Fairbanks Census Area, Alaska
Census-designated places in Unorganized Borough, Alaska
Essential Air Service